Canton is a town in Oxford County, Maine, United States. The population was 1,125 at the 2020 census. Located beside Lake Anasagunticook, Canton is a summer recreational area.

History

Canton Point was the site of Rockemeka, village of the Anasagunticook (or Androscoggin) Abenaki Indians. It is said the tribe had  cleared to raise corn. By 1757 the tribe population was devastated by smallpox.

The land became part of a grant the Massachusetts General Court awarded to Captain Joseph Phipps and 63 other soldiers for their services during the French and Indian War. Called Phipps-Canada, it would be incorporated in 1795 as Jay in honor of John Jay, the first chief justice of the U. S. Supreme Court. On February 5, 1821, Canton was set off from Jay and incorporated, named after Canton, Massachusetts.

Settlement began in the early 1790s when William Livermore, William French, Joseph Coolidge and Alexander Shepherd arrived. Others followed, principally from Massachusetts. The surface of the town is uneven in the outskirts, but smooth and level at Canton Point, where the soil was considered unsurpassed in the state for agriculture. The outlet of Lake Anasagunticook provided water power for industry. Gustavus Hayford settled here in 1814. In addition to a log cabin, he built a sawmill and gristmill. First called Hayford Mills, it would be renamed Canton Mills, and now Canton. In the 19th century, it had a machine shop to manufacture farm implements, a tinware factory and an iron foundry. It remains the business center. The Rumford Branch of the Maine Central Railroad passed through the town in the late 1850s, carrying freight but also tourists. The community developed as a resort area for camping.

In December 2005 the town began a project to relocate the town center and about 60 homes on the floodplains surrounding the Androscoggin River due to frequent spring flooding. Proposals have been floated to replace the vacated lots with parkland or nature trails.

Geography

Situated beside Lake Anasagunticook, Canton is drained by Whitney Brook and the Androscoggin River.

The town is crossed by state routes 108 and 140. It borders the towns of Jay to the northeast, Hartford to the south, Peru to the west, and Dixfield to the northwest.

Demographics

2010 census
As of the census of 2010, there were 990 people, 410 households, and 239 families living in the town. The racial makeup of the town was 97.3% White, 0.2% African American, 0.2% Native American, 0.2% Asian, 0.2% from other races, and 1.9% from two or more races. Hispanic or Latino of any race were 1.0% of the population.

There were 410 households, of which 22.2% had children under the age of 18 living with them, 44.1% were married couples living together, 8.5% had a female householder with no husband present, 5.6% had a male householder with no wife present, and 41.7% were non-families. 27.8% of all households were made up of individuals, and 9.2% had someone living alone who was 65 years of age or older. The average household size was 2.30 and the average family size was 2.83.

The median age in the town was 48 years. 17.2% of residents were under the age of 18; 7.1% were between the ages of 18 and 24; 20.2% were from 25 to 44; 33.7% were from 45 to 64; and 21.8% were 65 years of age or older. The gender makeup of the town was 47.9% male and 52.1% female.

2000 census
As of the census of 2000, there were 1,121 people, 400 households, and 273 families living in the town. There were 476 housing units at an average density of 16.4 per square mile (6.4/km2). The racial makeup of the town was 99.11% White, 0.09% African American, 0.18% Native American, 0.54% Asian, and 0.09% from two or more races. Hispanic or Latino of any race were 0.80% of the population.

There were 400 households, out of which 33.3% had children under the age of 18 living with them, 52.0% were married couples living together, 12.0% had a female householder with no husband present, and 31.8% were non-families. 25.0% of all households were made up of individuals, and 10.5% had someone living alone who was 65 years of age or older.  The average household size was 2.54 and the average family size was 3.06.

In the town, the population was spread out, with 23.9% under the age of 18, 5.5% from 18 to 24, 30.3% from 25 to 44, 21.6% from 45 to 64, and 18.6% who were 65 years of age or older.  The median age was 40 years. For every 100 females, there were 92.6 males.  For every 100 females age 18 and over, there were 97.5 males.

The median income for a household in the town was $32,625, and the median income for a family was $40,469. Males had a median income of $31,607 versus $21,094 for females. The per capita income for the town was $14,065.  About 14.0% of families and 19.4% of the population were below the poverty line, including 23.9% of those under age 18 and 22.5% of those age 65 or over.

Sites of interest
 Canton Historical Society
 The road shore beach of Lake Anasagunticook

Notable people 

 Cornelius Holland, US congressman
 Scott Kolk, US actor
 Stephany Stanley, Miss Maine (1998)
 John P. Swasey, US congressman

References

Further reading
 Canton, Maine Genealogy Project

External links

 Canton Town Website
 Maine.gov – Canton, Maine
 Photograph of Main Street, Canton, from the Maine Memory Network

Towns in Oxford County, Maine
Towns in Maine